Nyadorera is a settlement in Kenya's Nyanza Province.

References nyadorera 

Populated places in Nyanza Province